Marine Dafeur (born 20 October 1994) is a French footballer who plays as a defender for Division 1 Féminine club FC Fleury 91. She has been a member of the France women's national team.

International career
Despite having represented France, Dafeur changed alliance to Algeria in 2023, where she was called for a training camp with the Algerian team from 13–21 February 2023.

References

External links
 
 

1994 births
Living people
People from Douai
Sportspeople from Nord (French department)
French women's footballers
Women's association football defenders
Division 1 Féminine players
En Avant Guingamp (women) players
France women's youth international footballers
France women's international footballers
FC Fleury 91 (women) players
Lille OSC (women) players
Footballers from Hauts-de-France
FCF Hénin-Beaumont players